Epipsestis mediofusca is a moth in the family Drepanidae described by Yoshimoto in 1982. It is found in Nepal and Tibet, China.

The wingspan is about 31 mm. The forewings are pale greyish ochreous, tinged with dark fuscous brown on the median area and with dark greyish ocher beyond the postmedian line. The hindwings are dark fuscous grey, with the basal half slightly paler.

References

Moths described in 1982
Thyatirinae